Pompey's Pillar is the name given to a Roman triumphal column in Alexandria, Egypt. Set up in honour of the Roman emperor Diocletian between 298–302 AD, the giant Corinthian column originally supported a colossal porphyry statue of the emperor in armour. It stands at the eastern side of the temenos of the Serapeum of Alexandria, beside the ruins of the temple of Serapis itself. 

It is the only ancient monument still standing in Alexandria in its original location today.

Name
The name Sawari has been translated in many ways by scholars, including Severus (i.e. Emperor Septimius Severus).

The name of Pompey in relation to the pillar was used by many European writers in early modern times. The name is considered to stem from a historical misreading of the Greek dedicatory inscription on the base; the name ΠΟΥΠΛΙΟΣ was confused with ΠΟΜΠΗΙΟΣ.

Construction

In 297 Diocletian,  Augustus since 284, campaigned in Egypt to suppress the revolt of the usurper Domitius Domitianus. After a long siege, Diocletian captured Alexandria and executed Domitianus's successor Aurelius Achilleus in 298. In 302 the emperor returned to the city and inaugurated a state grain supply. The dedication of the column monument and its statue of Diocletian, describes Diocletian as polioúchos.  In the fourth century AD this designation also applied to Serapis, the male counterpart of Isis in the pantheon instituted by the Hellenistic rulers of Egypt, the Ptolemies. The sanctuary complex dedicated to Serapis in which the column was originally erected, the Serapeum, was built under King Ptolemy III Euergetes in the third century BC and probably rebuilt in the era of the second century AD emperor Hadrian after it sustained damage in the Kitos Wars; in the later fourth century AD it was considered by Ammianus Marcellinus a marvel rivalled only by Rome's sanctuary to Jupiter Optimus Maximus on the Capitoline Hill, the Capitolium.

The only known monolithic column in Roman Egypt (i.e., not composed of drums), it is one of the largest ancient monoliths and one of the largest monolithic columns ever erected. Both are of lapis syenites, a pink granite cut from the ancient quarries at Syene (modern Aswan), while the column capital of pseudo-Corinthian type is of grey granite. The weight of the column shaft is estimated to be 285 tonnes.

The surviving and readable four lines of the inscription in Greek on the column's socle relate that a Praefectus Aegypti called Publius dedicated the monument in Diocletian's honour. A praefectus aegypti named Publius is attested in two papyri from Oxyrrhynchus; his governorship must have been held in between the prefectures of Aristius Optatus, who is named as governor on 16 March 297, and Clodius Culcianus, in office from 303 or even late 302. Since Publius's name appears as the monument's dedicator, the column and stylite statue of Diocletian must have been completed between 297 and 303, while he was in post. The governor's name is largely erased in the damaged inscription; the Greek rendering of Publius as ΠΟΥΠΛΙΟΣ was confused with the Greek spelling of the Republican general of the first century BC Pompey, ΠΟΜΠΗΙΟΣ.

The porphyry statue of Diocletian in armour is known from large fragments that existed at the column's foot in the eighteenth century AD. While some fragments of the statue were known to be in European collections in the nineteenth century, their whereabouts were unknown by the 1930s and are presumed lost.

It is possible that the large column supporting Diocletian's statue was accompanied by another column, or three smaller columns bearing statues of Diocletian's co-emperors, the Augustus Maximian and the two Caesares Constantius and Galerius. If so, the group of column-statues would have commemorated the college of emperors of the Tetrarchy instituted in Diocletian's reign.

Ascents

Muslim traveller Ibn Battuta visited Alexandria in 1326 AD. He describes the pillar and recounts the tale of an archer who shot an arrow tied to a string over the column. This enabled him to pull a rope tied to the string over the pillar and secure it on the other side in order to climb over to the top of the pillar.

In early 1803, British naval officer Commander John Shortland of HMS Pandour flew a kite over Pompey's Pillar. This enabled him to get ropes over it, and then a rope ladder. On February 2, he and John White, Pandours Master, climbed it. When they got to the top they displayed the Union Jack, drank a toast to King George III, and gave three cheers. Four days later they climbed the pillar again, erected a staff, fixed a weather vane, ate a beef steak, and again toasted the king. An etymology of the nickname "Pompey" for the Royal Navy's home port of Portsmouth and its football team suggests these sailors became known as "Pompey's boys" after scaling the Pillar, and the moniker spread; other unrelated origins are also possible.

Gallery

See also 
 List of ancient architectural records
 Browne-Clayton Monument
 Pompey's Pillar (disambiguation), listing other things named for this pillar

Notes

References

Sources 
 

Buildings and structures completed in the 3rd century
Buildings and structures in Alexandria
Roman victory columns
Corinthian columns
Monoliths